Scleroderma areolatum is a basidiomycete fungus and a member of the genus Scleroderma, or "earth balls."

Like most members of Scleroderma, S. areolatum resembles but is only distantly related to the giant puffball.  It can be distinguished from the giant puffball by cutting it in half; the puffball will have a solid, denser middle, with no signs of a developing cap mushroom. They are usually 1–5 cm in diameter, and grow individually or in small groups. They are commonly found in deciduous forests, in neutral soil.  They are poisonous, and ingestion can lead to vomiting, diarrhea, and in larger quantities, fainting.

References

Boletales
Poisonous fungi
Puffballs
Taxa named by Christian Gottfried Ehrenberg